Hero of Rome is a 1964 sword and sandal film set in Rome in 508 BC, and depicts the expulsion of the last kings of Rome and the legend of Gaius Mucius Scaevola.

Plot
The city-state of Rome has just expelled its Etruscan overlords and become a republic. The Etruscans declare war in an attempt to regain their territory. The warrior Scaevola is captured trying to assassinate king Porsenna, and threatened with torture unless he gives them strategic information. Scaevola instead thrusts his right hand into a brazier and lets it burn, demonstrating that he loves Rome too much to care about physical pain, and warns the king that many other Romans would do the same. 

The awed Porsenna releases him and sues for peace after learning the truth about how the Romans banished their last king, Lucius Tarquinius Superbus. However, Tarquin still wants to continue the war to regain his throne, and orders his men to kill Mucius later. Surviving the ambush, Mucius returns to Rome to lead his countrymen, but the damage to his hand prevents him from wielding a sword in his right hand again. 

The Roman Senate manages the war badly, and it becomes clear that only Scaevola can lead his countrymen to victory. He trains himself to fight with his left hand, and is soon able to return to battle and defeat the Etruscan kings.

Cast
Gordon Scott as Gaius Mucius Scaevola
Gabriella Pallotta as Cloelia
Massimo Serato as Lucius Tarquinius Superbus
Roldano Lupi as Porsenna
Gabriele Antonini as Arunte
Maria Pia Conte as Valeria 
Franco Fantasia as Claudio

Release
Hero of Rome was released in Italy with a 90-minute running time on June 25, 1964. Some of the early video prints confused the correct order of the reels.

Reception
A anonymous reviewer in the Monthly Film Bulletin reviewed a dubbed version titled Arm of Fire.  The review declared that the films narrative was "unconvincing and improbable" and that the dialogue was hampered by English dialogue that was "on the level of the cartoon strip" while the "climactic spectacle is competently handled, but other ocular highlights are few."

References

Bibliography

External links
 

1964 films
French historical adventure films
Films set in ancient Rome
Films based on classical mythology
Films set in Italy
Peplum films
Films directed by Giorgio Ferroni
Films set in the 6th century BC
Films scored by Angelo Francesco Lavagnino
Sword and sandal films
Cultural depictions of Lucius Tarquinius Superbus
1960s Italian-language films
1960s Italian films